RIP 73 (route d’intérêt provincial 73) is a secondary road in Sava Region, Madagascar.

See also
List of roads in Madagascar
Transport in Madagascar

References

Roads in Vakinankaratra
Roads in Madagascar